This article lists cases in English law where anonymised privacy injunctions have been obtained. As super-injunctions can also be considered a type of anonymised privacy injunction they have also been included below.

Anonymised privacy injunctions

Lifetime privacy injunctions
Lifetime privacy injunctions prevent the publication of a new identity.

Super-injunctions

The following cases are super-injunctions where the existence of the injunction itself was also secret:

References

External links
Inforrm blog

English privacy case law
English privacy law